Gägelow is a municipality in the Nordwestmecklenburg district, in Mecklenburg-Vorpommern, Germany.

Geography

Hamlets of Gägelow

Jamel
Jamel, one of the hamlets in Gägelow, has become infamous because it is ruled by neo-Nazis.

Coat of Arms
The coat of arms of Gägelow were designed by Michael Zapfe of Wismar and approved by the Ministry of the Interior on the 4th of November, 1996.

Photogallery

References

External links

Municipalities in Mecklenburg-Western Pomerania
Nordwestmecklenburg